Röstånga is a locality situated in Svalöv Municipality, Skåne County, Sweden with around 1100 inhabitants.

At Röstånga there is an entrance to the Söderåsen National Park. The main entrance is at Skäralid, 5 km further north. There is also a valley called Nackarpsdalen, at the end of which there is a lake called Odensjön.

To get to Röstånga by public transport, one can take a local train to Stehag, then bus (directions Klippan, Skäralid and Ljungbyhed). There are also bus connections with Svalöv and Teckomatorp.

References 

Populated places in Svalöv Municipality
Populated places in Skåne County